Estonian Women's Union (abbreviated ENL) is an Estonian organization which is the umbrella organization of Estonian women organizations, and which deals with topics related to women in Estonia.

ENL is established in 1920 as Union of Estonian Women's Organizations. First leader of ENL was Marie Reisik. In 1940, ENL was closed. ENL is re-established on 13 May 1989 in Tartu.

1996–2019, the leader of ENL was Siiri Oviir. Since 2019, the leader of ENL is Mailis Alt.

Every year, ENL chooses Mother of Year and Father of Year.

See also
 Tartu Eesti Naesterahva Selts

References

External links
 

Women's organizations based in Estonia